This is a list of  Time Team  episodes from series 6.

Episode

Series 6

Episode # refers to the air date order. The Time Team Specials are aired in between regular episodes, but are omitted from this list. Regular contributors on Time Team include: Tony Robinson (presenter); archaeologists Mick Aston, Phil Harding, Carenza Lewis, Beric Morley; Guy de la Bédoyère (historian); Victor Ambrus (illustrator); Stewart Ainsworth (landscape investigator); John Gater, Chris Gaffney (Geophysics); Henry Chapman (surveyor); Mark Corney (Roman expert).

References

External links
Time Team at Channel4.com
The Unofficial Time Team site Fan site

Time Team (Series 06)
1999 British television seasons